In engineering, a heat shield is a component designed to protect an object or a human operator from being burnt or overheated by dissipating, reflecting, or absorbing heat. The term is most often used in reference to exhaust heat management and to systems for dissipating frictional heat.

Principles of operation
Heat shields protect structures from extreme temperatures and thermal gradients by two primary mechanisms. Thermal insulation and radiative cooling, respectively isolate the underlying structure from high external surface temperatures, while emitting heat outwards through thermal radiation. To achieve good functionality the three attributes required of a heat shield are low thermal conductivity (high thermal resistance), high emissivity, and good thermal stability (refractoriness). Porous ceramics with high emissivity coatings (HECs) are often employed to address these three characteristics, owing to the good thermal stability of ceramics, the thermal insulation of porous materials and the good radiative cooling effects offered by HECs.

Uses

Automotive

Due to the large amounts of heat given off by internal combustion engines, heat shields are used on most engines to protect components and bodywork from heat damage. As well as protection, effective heat shields can give a performance benefit by reducing the under-bonnet temperatures, therefore reducing the intake temperature. Heat shields vary widely in price, but most are easy to fit, usually by stainless steel clips or high temperature tape. There are two main types of automotive heat shield:
 The rigid heat shield has, until recently, been made from solid steel, but is now often made from aluminum. Some high-end rigid heat shields are made out of aluminum sheet or other composites, with a ceramic thermal barrier coating to improve the heat insulation.
 The flexible heat shield is normally made from thin aluminum sheeting, sold either flat or in a roll, and is bent by hand, by the fitter. High performance flexible heat shields sometimes include extras, such as ceramic insulation applied via plasma spraying. These latest products are commonplace in top-end motorsports such as Formula 1.
 Textile heat shields used for various components such as the exhaust, turbo, DPF, or other exhaust components.
As a result, a heat shield is often fitted by both amateur and professional personnel during a phase of engine tuning.

Heat shields are also used to cool engine mount vents. When a vehicle is at higher speed there is enough ram air to cool the under the hood engine compartment, but when the vehicle is moving at lower speeds or climbing a gradient there is a need of insulating the engine heat to get transferred to other parts around it, e.g. Engine Mounts. With the help of proper thermal analysis and use of heat shields, the engine mount vents can be optimised for the best performances.

Aircraft
Some aircraft at high speed, such as the Concorde and SR-71 Blackbird, must be designed considering similar, but lower, overheating to what occurs in spacecraft. In the case of the Concorde the aluminum nose can reach a maximum operating temperature of 127 °C (which is 180 °C higher than the ambient air outside which is below zero); the metallurgical consequences associated with the peak temperature were a significant factor in determining the maximum aircraft speed.

Recently new materials have been developed that could be superior to RCC. The prototype SHARP (Slender Hypervelocity Aerothermodynamic Research Probe) is based on ultra-high temperature ceramics such as zirconium diboride (ZrB2) and hafnium diboride (HfB2). The thermal protection system based on these materials would allow to reach a speed of Mach number 7 at sea level, Mach 11 at 35000 meters and significant improvements for vehicles designed for hypersonic speed. The materials used have thermal protection characteristics in a temperature range from 0 °C to + 2000 °C, with melting point at over 3500 °C. They are also structurally more resistant than RCC, so they do not require additional reinforcements, and are very efficient in re-irradiating the absorbed heat. NASA funded (and subsequently discontinued) a research and development program in 2001 for testing this protection system through the University of Montana.

The European Commission funded a research project, C3HARME, under the NMP-19-2015 call of Framework Programmes for Research and Technological Development in 2016 (still ongoing) for the design, development, production and testing of a new class of ultra-refractory ceramic matrix composites reinforced with silicon carbide fibers and carbon fibers suitable for applications in severe aerospace environments.

Spacecraft

Spacecraft that land on a planet with an atmosphere, such as Earth, Mars, and Venus, currently do so by entering the atmosphere at high speeds, depending on air resistance rather than rocket power to slow them down.  A side effect of this method of atmospheric re-entry is aerodynamic heating, which can be highly destructive to the structure of an unprotected or faulty spacecraft. An aerodynamic heat shield consists of a protective layer of special materials to dissipate the heat. Two basic types of aerodynamic heat shield have been used:
An ablative heat shield consists of a layer of plastic resin, the outer surface of which is heated to a gas, which then carries the heat away by convection. Such shields were used on the Mercury, Gemini, and Apollo spacecraft, and are currently used by the SpaceX Dragon 2 spacecraft and the Orion spacecraft.
A thermal soak heat shield uses an insulating material to absorb and radiate the heat away from the spacecraft structure. This type was used on the Space Shuttle, consisting of ceramic or composite tiles over most of the vehicle surface, with reinforced carbon-carbon material on the highest heat load points (the nose and wing leading edges). Damage to this material on a wing caused the 2003 Space Shuttle Columbia disaster.

With possible inflatable heat shields, as developed by the US (Low Earth Orbit Flight Test Inflatable Decelerator - LOFTID) and China, single-use rockets like the Space Launch System are considered to be retrofitted with such heat shields to salvage the expensive engines, possibly reducing the costs of launches significantly.

Passive cooling
Passive cooled protectors are used to protect spaceships during atmospheric entry to absorb heat peaks and subsequently irradiate heat to the atmosphere. Early versions included a substantial amount of metals such as titanium, beryllium and copper. This greatly increased the mass of the vehicle. Heat absorption and ablative systems became preferable.

In modern vehicles, passive cooling can be found as reinforced carbon–carbon material instead of metal. This material constitutes the thermal protection system of the nose and the front edges of the Space Shuttle and was proposed for the vehicle X-33. Carbon is the most refractory material known with a sublimation temperature (for graphite) of 3825 °C. These characteristics make it a material particularly suitable for passive cooling, but with the disadvantage of being very expensive and fragile. Some spacecraft also use a heat shield (in the conventional automotive sense) to protect fuel tanks and equipment from the heat produced by a large rocket engine.  Such shields were used on the Apollo Service Module and Lunar Module descent stage.

Military
Heat shields are often affixed to semi-automatic or automatic rifles and shotguns as barrel shrouds in order to protect the user's hands from the heat caused by firing shots in rapid succession. They have also often been affixed to pump-action combat shotguns, allowing the soldier to grasp the barrel while using a bayonet.

Industry 
Heat shield are use in metallurgical industry to protect structure steel of the building or other equipment from the high temperature of nearby liquid metal

See also

Aeroshell
Atmospheric reentry
AVCOAT
Intumescent
Starlite
Sunshield (JWST)

References

Spacecraft components
Atmospheric entry
Auto parts